is a Japanese jazz pianist and composer.

Life and career
Yamamoto was largely self-taught as a pianist, although he did have piano lessons as a child. He attended Nihon University. As a student there, he played professionally, first as an accompanist to pop singer Micky Curtis; they toured Europe in 1967. In 1974, he became house pianist at Misty, a Tokyo jazz club. He also made his recording debut as leader that year. He played major international festivals in the late 1970s. He also "lived in New York for a year, when he performed with Dizzy Gillespie, Carmen McRae, Sam Jones, Billy Higgins, Elvin Jones, and Sonny Stitt, among others."

Playing style
Commenting on Yamamoto's 2008 album What a Wonderful Trio!, Audiophile Audition noted that "Yamamoto seems to favor the very highest reaches of the treble keyboard with great gusto".

Discography
An asterisk (*) after the year indicates that it is the year of release.

As leader/co-leader

As sideman

References

1948 births
Japanese jazz pianists
Living people
Nihon University alumni
21st-century pianists